Erlend Storesund (born 22 February 1985 in Bergen) is a Norwegian footballer. He's a left footed winger, which had played for Brann all his life until he was loaned out to Løv-Ham the summer of 2005.

In January 2006 he signed a new contract with Brann, which was supposed to expire after the 2007 season, but due to Brann having too many players out on loan, it was annulled the summer before it expired, and Storesund signed a contract with Løv-Ham for the rest of the season, a contract that was subsequently prolonged. In 2012 Løv-Ham merged to form FK Fyllingsdalen and Storesund continued to play there.

Honours

Norway
Norwegian Cup: 2004

References

1985 births
Living people
Footballers from Bergen
Norwegian footballers
SK Brann players
Løv-Ham Fotball players
Eliteserien players
Norwegian First Division players

Association football midfielders